Niobium(V) chloride, also known as niobium pentachloride, is a yellow crystalline solid. It hydrolyzes in air, and samples are often contaminated with small amounts of NbOCl3.  It is often used as a precursor to other compounds of niobium.   NbCl5 may be purified by sublimation.

Structure and properties

Niobium(V) chloride forms chloro-bridged dimers in the solid state (see figure). Each niobium centre is six-coordinate, but the octahedral coordination is significantly distorted. The equatorial niobium–chlorine bond lengths are 225 pm (terminal) and 256 pm (bridging), whilst the axial niobium-chlorine bonds are 229.2 pm and are deflected inwards to form an angle of 83.7° with the equatorial plane of the molecule. The Nb–Cl–Nb angle at the bridge is 101.3°. The Nb–Nb distance is 398.8 pm, too long for any metal-metal interaction. NbBr5, TaCl5 and TaBr5 are isostructural with NbCl5, but NbI5 and TaI5 have different structures.

Preparation

Industrially, niobium pentachloride is obtained by direct chlorination of niobium metal at 300 to 350 °C:
2Nb  +  5Cl2  →   2NbCl5

In the laboratory, niobium pentachloride is often prepared from Nb2O5, the main challenge being incomplete reaction to give NbOCl3.  The conversion can be effected with thionyl chloride: It also can be prepared by chlorination of niobium pentoxide in the presence of carbon at 300 °C.

Uses
Niobium(V) chloride is the main precursor to the alkoxides of niobium, which find uses in sol-gel processing. It is also the precursor to many other Nb-containing reagents, including most organoniobium compounds.

In organic synthesis, NbCl5 is a very specialized Lewis acid in activating alkenes for the carbonyl-ene reaction and the Diels-Alder reaction. Niobium chloride can also generate N-acyliminium compounds from certain pyrrolidines which are substrates for nucleophiles such as allyltrimethylsilane, indole, or the silyl enol ether of benzophenone.

References

External links
 Safety information from ChemExper
 NIST Standard Reference Database

Niobium(V) compounds
Chlorides
Metal halides